The Mondobhag train collision occurred on 12 November 2019 at Mondobhag railway station, Kasba, Bangladesh. Two trains were involved. At least sixteen people were killed and 58 were injured.

Accident
At 03:00 local time (09:00 UTC) a collision occurred between two trains at Kasba, Bangladesh. The Turna Nishita passenger train bound for Dhaka and hauled by Class 2900 locomotive 2923 collided with the Udayan Express passenger train bound for Chittagong. Three carriages of the Udayan Express were destroyed. Most of the casualties were in those vehicles. At least sixteen people were killed and 100 were injured. Forty people were taken to hospital. It was reported that the Turna Nishita should have been held outside the station to let the Udayan Express pass. It was reported that the driver of the Turna Nishita passed a signal at danger. He was one of three people suspended after the accident.

Investigation
An investigation was opened into the accident. The committee found that the Loco master of Turna Nishita was responsible for the accident.

References

2019 disasters in Bangladesh
Brahmanbaria District
November 2019 events in Bangladesh
Railway accidents and incidents in Bangladesh
Railway accidents in 2019
Railway accidents involving a signal passed at danger